Gennaro Anthony Sirico Jr. (July 29, 1942 – July 8, 2022) was an American actor. He was best known for his role as Paulie "Walnuts" Gualtieri in The Sopranos. He also made numerous appearances in the films of Woody Allen.

Early life
Sirico was born in Brooklyn, New York City, on July 29, 1942, to a family of Italian descent. He grew up in the East Flatbush and Bensonhurst neighborhoods of Brooklyn, and attended Midwood High School, but did not graduate. Sirico's brother, Robert Sirico, is a Catholic priest and co-founder of the free-market Acton Institute.

Sirico was convicted of several crimes and was arrested 28 times, including for disorderly conduct, assault, and robbery, before taking up acting. On February 27, 1970, he was arrested at a restaurant, and found with a .32 caliber revolver on his person. In 1971, he was indicted for extortion, coercion, and felony weapons possession, convicted, and sentenced to four years in prison, of which he served 20 months at Sing Sing. 

According to a court transcript at the time of his sentencing, Sirico was the owner of a discotheque in Manhattan, and also had pending charges for criminal possession of a dangerous drug. Sirico stated that he was visited by an acting troupe composed of ex-convicts during his imprisonment, which inspired him to give acting a try. He appeared in the 1989 documentary The Big Bang by James Toback, in which he discussed his earlier life.

Career
Sirico's first confirmed role in film was as an extra in the 1974 film Crazy Joe, securing the role with the help of Richard Castellano. Michael Gazzo was Sirico's first acting coach. Sirico played gangsters in a number of films, and made-for-TV films, including Goodfellas, Mob Queen, Mighty Aphrodite, Love and Money, Fingers, The One Man Jury, Defiance, The Last Fight, Innocent Blood, Bullets over Broadway, The Pick-up Artist, Gotti, Witness to the Mob, The Search for One-eye Jimmy, Cop Land, Turn of Faith, Hello Again, Mickey Blue Eyes, and Wonder Wheel. He also played policemen in the films Dead Presidents and Deconstructing Harry. Sirico was a close friend of Woody Allen, and appeared in seven of his films.

Sirico's most acclaimed acting job was that of Paulie Gualtieri in David Chase's Emmy award-winning drama, The Sopranos. He originally auditioned for the role of Uncle Junior with Frank Vincent, but Dominic Chianese landed the role. David Chase instead offered him the role of Paulie Gualtieri; Sirico agreed under the condition that his character "would not become a rat".

In animation, Sirico provided the voice of "Big Daddy" Fairywinkle in The Fairly OddParents. On Family Guy, he voiced the character of Vinny, who for three episodes in late 2013 was the family's pet dog, replacing Brian Griffin after his death; Brian would later be brought back via time travel. Sirico also made a live-action cameo in the episode "Stewie, Chris, & Brian's Excellent Adventure", where he threatens Stewie, who had insulted Italians, calling them "ridiculous people". Vinny would return in a cameo appearance at the end of the Season 15 premiere, "The Boys in the Band". Sirico would later voice characters on Seth MacFarlane's other animated series American Dad!.

In 2018, he reunited with former Sopranos actors Federico Castelluccio and Vincent Pastore in Sarah Q.

Personal life

Sirico had two children, Joanne and Richard. In 1999, he and Sopranos co-star Vincent Pastore met with James Clemenza and his brother Jerry, Colombo crime family soldiers, at a Christmas party in Little Italy, Manhattan. Clemenza was under FBI surveillance at the time.

In 2008, he released a cologne called Paolo Per Uomo.

Sirico died on the afternoon of July 8, 2022, at an assisted living facility in Fort Lauderdale, Florida, three weeks before his 80th birthday. No cause of death was given, but he had been diagnosed with dementia some years before his death. Sirico's funeral mass was held at the Basilica of Regina Pacis, and he was interred at Calvary Cemetery in Queens, New York.

Filmography

Film

Television

Video games

Awards and nominations

References

External links
 

1942 births
2022 deaths
20th-century American male actors
21st-century American male actors
American male film actors
American male television actors
American people of Italian descent
Inmates of Sing Sing
Male actors from New York City
New York (state) Republicans
People from Bensonhurst, Brooklyn
People from Flatbush, Brooklyn
Burials at Calvary Cemetery (Queens)